Thomas Robbins (1943 – 2015) was an author and an independent scholar of sociology of religion.

Life and work
Robbins obtained a B.A. in government from Harvard University in 1965, and a Ph.D. in Sociology, at the University of North Carolina in 1973. He subsequently held teaching or research positions at Queens College (CUNY), the New School for Social Research, Yale University and the Graduate Theological Union. He has authored numerous articles and reviews for sociological and religious journals.

Among Robbins' early work are notable studies comparing contemporary and historical controversies, such as the mass suicides among the Russian Old Believers and those that occurred in Jonestown in 1979, or present-day agitation against "cults" and similar controversies surrounding Catholicism, Mormonism and Freemasonry in the early nineteenth century. From the mid-1980s, Robbins became increasingly focused on legal and church-state issues related to new religious movements.  He has written extensively on the legal and social-science issues related to the alleged use of mind control by therapeutic and religious groups. Together with his colleague, the psychologist Dick Anthony, Robbins has been one of the most prominent critics of the anti-cult movement's views on brainwashing.

Publications

Articles and book chapters
 D. Anthony and T. Robbins, "Law, Social Science and the 'Brainwashing' Exception to the First Amendment," Behavioral Sciences and the Law 10(1992):5-30
 D. Anthony and T. Robbins, "Religious Totalism, Violence, and Exemplary Dualism," in Terrorism and Political Violence 7(1995):10-50
 T. Robbins, "Religious Mass Suicide Before Jonestown," Sociological Analysis 41(1986):1-20
 T. Robbins and D. Anthony, "Cults, Brainwashing and Counter-Subversion," Annals 446(1979):78-90
 T. Robbins and D. Anthony, "Sects and Violence," in Armageddon at Waco, ed. S. A. Wright (Chicago: University of Chicago Press, 1995): 236-259
 T. Robbins and D. Bromley, "Social Experimentation and the Significance of American New Religions," Research in the Social Scientific Study of Religion, Vol. 4 (Greenwich, Conn.: JAI, 1992): 1-29
 T. Robbins and R. Robertson, "Studying Religion Today," Religion 21(1991):319-339.

Books
 D. Anthony and T. Robbins (eds.), In Gods We Trust: New Patterns of Religious Pluralism in America, Transaction Publishers, 1981, 1990, 1996, 
 R. Anthony, J. Needleman, T. Robbins,  The New Religious Movements: Conversion, Coercion and Commitment, Crossroad Publishing Company, 1983, 
 T. Robbins, W. C. Shepherd, J. McBride (eds.), Cults, Culture, and the Law: Perspectives on New Religious Movements, American Academy of Religion, Studies in Religion, No 36, Scholars Press, 1985, 
 T. Robbins and R. Robertson, Church-state Relations: Tensions and Transitions, Transaction Publishers, 1987, 
 T. Robbins, Cults, Converts, and Charisma: the Sociology of New Religious Movements, Sage Publications, 1988, 
T. Robbins and S. J. Palmer (eds.), Millennium, Messiahs, and Mayhem: Contemporary Apocalyptic Movements, Routledge, 1997, 
 B. Zablocki and T. Robbins (eds.), Misunderstanding Cults: Searching for Objectivity in a Controversial Field, Toronto, University of Toronto Press, 2001, 
 P. C. Lucas and T. Robbins (eds.), New Religious Movements in the 21st Century: Legal, Political, and Social Challenges in Global Perspective, New York, Routledge, 2004, 

Notes

External links
 Profile at the International Cultic Studies Association website
 Robbins' entry in the Encyclopedia of Religion and Society''

1943 births
2015 deaths
Harvard College alumni
American sociologists
Researchers of new religious movements and cults
Independent scholars
University of North Carolina at Chapel Hill alumni